The cry of Rinehart! (more fully Oh, R-i-i-i-n-e-HART!) was a part of Harvard University student and alumni culture in the early decades of the 20th century.

The cry refers to an unknown undergraduate's call, from ground to dormitory window, for John Bryce Gordon Rinehart (1875–1954; Harvard class of 1900). His cry of "Oh, R-i-i-i-n-e-HART!" drifting across Harvard Yard was inexplicably and spontaneously taken up by hundreds of students in the Yard and at open windows of surrounding dormitories. This phenomenon first occurred on June 11, 1900, and for the next forty years cries of "Oh, R-i-i-i-n-e-HART!" (described as "Harvard's rebel yell") could be heard at random times and around the world, wherever Harvard men traveled or congregated, sometimes signalling the start of merry revelry.

John Barrymore mentioned the "Rinehart!" cry in the 1939 film The Great Man Votes. The call was included by journalist George Frazier in his 1932 song  "Harvard Blues" (music by Tab Smith), recorded in 1941 by Count Basie and included on the compilation The Count Basie Story, Disc 3 - Harvard Blues (2001, Proper Records). 

Thomas Pynchon describes the cry in Against the Day:

Various legends grew up around the call; for instance, a Harvard man in Africa who was about to be kidnapped by some Arabs supposedly screamed "Rinehart!" and was rescued because there happened to be another Harvard man nearby in the French Foreign Legion.

Origin
It is now considered established that the original target of the call was James Bryce Gordon Rinehart (Harvard 1900). A contemporary piece in the Harvard Crimson adds details:

As this origin faded from memory, while the cry itself remained current, various false origin stories were circulated. One had Mr Rinehart hiring other students to call his name, to make him appear more popular. These origin stories were collected, and a new one suggested, by Gordon Allport in a prize-winning undergraduate essay.

Further reading

References

1900 in Massachusetts
1900s fads and trends
Harvard University
Traditions by university or college in the United States
1900s neologisms
Catchphrases